Albert Wolsky (born November 24, 1930) is an American costume designer. He has worked both on stage shows as well as for film, and has been nominated for an Academy Award for Best Costume Design seven times, winning two awards for his work on the films All That Jazz (1979) and Bugsy (1991).

Early life, military service and early career
Wolsky was born in Paris, France, but during World War II, he and the rest of his family fled to the United States to escape the German occupation.  After graduating from the City College of New York, he served in the army from 1953 to 1956, spending most of his enlistment in Japan. Once he returned to the United States, he began working in his father's travel agency. However, he decided to change careers and took an assistant's job with notable costume maker Helene Pons.

Career
Wolsky became a well regarded costume designer, working both on Broadway and in the motion picture industry.

The first film Wolsky worked on was The Heart Is a Lonely Hunter. He worked on many films including Harry and Tonto, The Turning Point, Grease and Manhattan. He worked with Bob Fosse, a leading Broadway director, on All That Jazz and won his first Academy Award.  He won his second Academy Award for Bugsy in 1991 and has been nominated five other times, most recently for his work on Julie Taymor's Beatles-inspired musical Across the Universe (2007) and Sam Mendes's Revolutionary Road (2008).

He began his career as costume designer for the theatre by assisting costume designer Ann Roth on A Case of Libel (1963); he later assisted Roth on The Odd Couple (1965), Patricia Zipprodt on Fiddler on the Roof (1964), and Theoni Aldredge on Illya Darling (1967).  His first work as lead costumer was Generation (1965). He went on to serve as principal costume designer for both plays and musicals, including The Sunshine Boys (1972) and Sly Fox (1976).  Wolsky has been announced as the designer for the 2012 Broadway production of The Heiress.

In 2010, Wolsky donated his costume design sketches to the Margaret Herrick Library at the Academy of Motion Picture Arts and Sciences.

Film credits

Honors and awards
Academy Awards
Winner: All That Jazz, 1980; Bugsy, 1992
Nominee: Sophie's Choice, 1983; The Journey of Natty Gann, 1986; Toys, 1993; Across the Universe, 2008; Revolutionary Road, 2009
Hollywood Film Award, Costume Designer of the Year, 2004
Costume Designers Guild, Career Achievement Award, 1999
TDF/Irene Sharaff Lifetime Achievement Award, 2010
Antoinette Perry Award
2013 Best Costume Design of a Play for The Heiress (nominee)
Drama Desk Award
1976 Outstanding Costume Design for They Knew What They Wanted (nominee)
1976 Outstanding Costume Design for A Memory of Two Mondays / 27 Wagons Full of Cotton (nominee)
1977 Outstanding Costume Design for Sly Fox (nominee)

Memberships
Wolsky is a member of the Board of Governors of the Academy of Motion Picture Arts and Sciences.

Personal life
His partner of thirty-nine years was actor James Mitchell who died in 2010.

Bibliography
Chaneles, Sol & Wolsky, Albert (1974) The Movie Makers: the lives and films of more than 2,500 stars, supporting actors, and directors who have made motion picture history.  Secaucus, NJ: Derbibooks

References

Further reading
"Wolsky, Albert."  Contemporary Theater, Film, and Television.  Vol. 36.  Ed. Thomas Riggs.  Farmington Hills, MI: Gale Group, 2001.  379–80.

External links

Interview, March 17, 2009
Albert Wolsky costume design drawings, 1977–2007, Margaret Herrick Library, Academy of Motion Picture Arts and Sciences

1930 births
Living people
21st-century American LGBT people
Best Costume Design Academy Award winners
American gay artists
French emigrants to the United States
City College of New York alumni
United States Army soldiers